Timothy Robert Corcoran II (born March 17, 1973) is an American politician. A member of the Democratic Party, he has served in the Vermont House of Representatives since being first elected in 2002. His father, Timothy R. Corcoran, served in the House from 1981 to 1995 and as Bennington town clerk from 1995 to 2014.

References

External links
 Representative Timothy R. Corcoran
 Profile at Vote Smart

Living people
1973 births
People from Bennington, Vermont
Johnson State College alumni
Democratic Party members of the Vermont House of Representatives
21st-century American politicians